Ahmadabad-e Fallah (also Romanized as Aḩmadābād-e Fallāḩ; also known as Aḩmadābād) is a village in Bahreman Rural District, Nuq District, Rafsanjan County, Kerman Province, Iran. At the 2006 census, its population was 169, in 36 families.

References 

Populated places in Rafsanjan County